Harold Lang Winkler (March 20, 1894 – May 29, 1956) was a Canadian ice hockey goaltender. He played in the Western Canada Hockey League and National Hockey League between 1921 and 1928.

Biography
Winkler started his professional hockey career with the Edmonton Eskimos of the Western Canada Hockey League in 1922.  He would also play with the Calgary Tigers. In 1926, he moved to the New York Rangers of the National Hockey League.  He would also play with the Boston Bruins who acquired him from the Rangers in a cash transaction on January 17, 1927.

According to Winkler's obituary in the May 31, 1956 edition of the Montreal Gazette, he was given the unflattering nickname "Baldy" because he had lost his hair at an early age. Winkler wore a modified baseball cap in goal partly because rival fans often threw objects at his hairless pate.

Winkler recorded 15 shutouts in 44 games for the Bruins in 1927–28. Despite the NHL's regular season almost doubling in length from what it was in 1927–28, Winkler's mark is a single-season team record that still stands. Winkler recorded two playoff shutouts for Boston during the 1927 Stanley Cup playoffs. Both games were scoreless ties.

During the 1957–58 season the Stanley Cup was redone. Winkler's name was added to the Stanley Cup as a member of the 1929 Bruins. He played the whole season in the minors, as teams carried only one goaltender the backup goaltender would play for the teams minor league affiliate, for Winkler this was the Minneapolis Millers the Boston Bruins minor league team in the AHA.

His death at age 62 (wrongly reported as age 64 in the Montreal Gazette), came after "a lengthy illness." Winkler died at the Winnipeg General Hospital.

Career statistics

Regular season and playoffs

Awards and achievements
WCHL All-Star Team (1923)

External links
 

1894 births
1956 deaths
Boston Bruins players
Boston Tigers (CAHL) players
Calgary Tigers players
Canadian ice hockey goaltenders
Canadian people of German descent
Edmonton Eskimos (ice hockey) players
Ice hockey people from Manitoba
Minneapolis Millers (AHA) players
New York Rangers players
People from Pembina Valley Region, Manitoba
Seattle Eskimos players
Stanley Cup champions
Winnipeg Hockey Club players
Winnipeg Monarchs players
Canadian expatriate ice hockey players in the United States